In mathematics, Sullivan conjecture or Sullivan's conjecture on maps from classifying spaces can refer to any of several results and conjectures prompted by homotopy theory work of Dennis Sullivan. A basic theme and motivation concerns the fixed point set in group actions of a finite group . The most elementary formulation, however, is in terms of the classifying space  of such a group. Roughly speaking, it is difficult to map such a space  continuously into a finite CW complex  in a non-trivial manner. Such a version of the Sullivan conjecture was first proved by Haynes Miller.

The mapping space  is an example of a homotopy fixed point set. Miller's theorem is that η is a weak equivalence for trivial -actions on finite-dimensional CW complexes.

In, Sullivan conjectured that η is a weak equivalence after a certain p-completion procedure due to A. Bousfield and D. Kan for the group . Miller's proof involves an unstable Adams spectral sequence, Carlsson's proof uses his affirmative solution of the Segal conjecture and also provides information about the homotopy fixed points  before completion, and Lannes's proof involves his T-functor.

References

External links

Book extract
J. Lurie's course notes

Conjectures that have been proved
Fixed points (mathematics)
Homotopy theory